The 1982 Little League World Series took place between August 24 and August 28 in Williamsport, Pennsylvania. The Kirkland National Little League of Kirkland, Washington, defeated the Puzih Little League of Chiayi County, Taiwan, in the championship game of the 36th Little League World Series.

The historic victory by Kirkland snapped the 31-game winning streak by Taiwanese teams and their streak of five consecutive titles. These streaks by Taiwan still stand, and have not been seriously approached by another country or U.S. state. Kirkland's championship was recounted by ESPN's 30 for 30 documentary series in an episode titled "Little Big Men" (season 1, episode 19), which originally aired in 2010.

Teams

Championship bracket

Position bracket

Notable players
Wilson Álvarez (Maracaibo, Venezuela) – MLB pitcher between 1989 and 2005
Stéphane Matteau (Rouyn-Noranda, Quebec) – NHL winger from 1990 to 2003
Pierre Turgeon (Rouyn-Noranda, Quebec) – NHL center from 1987 to 2007; inducted to the Little League Hall of Excellence in 2007.

Champions path
The Kirkland National Little League won four games to reach the LLWS.

References

External links

Little League World Series
Little League World Series
Little League World Series